Dennis Rea (born July 7, 1957) is an American guitarist, author, and music event organizer. He was a member of the electronic music group Earthstar in the late 1970s and early 1980s. He leads the progressive rock quintet Moraine and worked with Jeff Greinke in Land. Other significant involvements have included Flame Tree,  Identity Crisis, Iron Kim Style, Savant, Stackpole, Tempered Steel, and Zhongyu.
 
Rea has collaborated with Hector Zazou, Bill Rieflin and Trey Gunn of King Crimson, Hawkwind cofounder Nik Turner, Chinese rock musician Cui Jian, drummer Han Bennink, Tuvan throat singers Albert Kuvezin and Saylik Ommun, and Mexican experimental duo Cabezas de Cera. He has appeared on more than 40 recordings to date on labels including MoonJune, Sky, RVNG Intl., Light in the Attic, First World, Extreme, C/Z, Purple Pyramid, Materiali Sonori, and Palace of Lights. He has performed throughout the U.S. and in China, Russia, Tuva, Germany, the UK, Taiwan, and Mexico.
 
In the late 1980s and early 1990s, Rea collaborated with many notable Chinese musicians. He was one of the first Western musicians to record an album for the state-owned China Record Corporation.

His activities in East Asia are detailed in his book Live at the Forbidden City: Musical Encounters in China and Taiwan. He is a co-organizer of the annual Seaprog festival and several concert series. For more than a decade he helped organize the Seattle Improvised Music Festival.

Early years
Rea was motivated to start playing guitar at the age of nine or ten by Mike Nesmith of The Monkees. Two albums that had a big impact on him were In the Court of the Crimson King by King Crimson and the soundtrack for  2001: A Space Odyssey by György Ligeti.

Other influences include Soft Machine, Gentle Giant, Henry Cow, Miles Davis, John Coltrane, AACM, Mahavishnu Orchestra, Oregon, John Cage, Karlheinz Stockhausen, and Morton Subotnick. As a guitarist, his influences include John Abercrombie, Larry Coryell, Jimi Hendrix, John McLaughlin, Terje Rypdal, and Ralph Towner. His musical career began in the early 1970s when he formed the progressive-rock group Zuir in his hometown of Utica, New York.

Career
In the late 1970s Rea recorded in Germany with Earthstar, a band formed by keyboardist Craig Wuest. Influenced by the German electronic music of the 1970s such as Tangerine Dream, Harmonia, Popol Vuh, and Klaus Schulze (who would later produce the group's 1978 album French Skyline), Earthstar consisted of members of Wuest, Zuir, and other musicians in Utica. In 1977 Earthstar signed with Moontower Records in Nashville. Moontower released the band's first album Salterbarty Tales during the following year. With Schulze's encouragement, Wuest moved to Germany in 1978 and recorded French Skyline and Atomkraft? Nein, Danke! for Sky Records in Hamburg. Rea joined Wuest and other members of Earthstar in Germany in 1979 and 1980 for sessions at Schulze's IC Studio and appeared on both releases. Earthstar participated in the German Kosmische Musik electronic music scene.

In the early 1980s Rea collaborated with composer K. Leimer in his experimental band Savant, which was described by Philip Sherburne in Pitchfork as "some of the most striking and original American electronic music of that period." Beginning in 1983 he lived in New York City for three years and was involved with the Downtown music scene. Returning to Seattle in the late 1980s, he performed with avant-rock bands (notably Color Anxiety and Fred) and became involved in free improvisation with Wally Shoup, Bill Horist, and Stuart Dempster. In 1988 he helped organize the first Seattle Improvised Music Festival. During the same year, he served as the title character's "sonic alter ego" in the film Shredder Orpheus.

Between 1989 and 1996 Rea spent several years in China and Taiwan, playing over 100 concerts at cultural centers, universities, conservatories, expatriate bars, religious celebrations, on radio, television, and in sports arenas with the Chinese pop star Zhang Xing. His 1990 solo album Shadow in Dreams for the state-run China Record Corporation sold 40,000 copies and was cited among the year's ten best releases by Party organ China Youth Daily. While abroad he organized three unofficial concert tours of China by progressive Western bands (Identity Crisis, The Vagaries, and Land), playing more than 40 concerts in Beijing, Chengdu, Chongqing, Kunming, Guangzhou, Hong Kong, and Macau, plus a performance at the 1991 Sichuan China International TV Festival viewed by a TV audience estimated in the hundreds of millions. He has performed with Cui Jian, Wang Yong, Liu Yuan, Liang Heping, He Yong, ADO, and Cobra. He has written about Chinese and other Asian music in CHIME, the Routledge Encyclopedia of Contemporary Chinese Culture, and the Routledge History of Social Protest in Popular Music. His adventures as a foreign musician in the Far East are chronicled in his memoir Live at the Forbidden City: Musical Encounters in China and Taiwan.

Returning to Seattle in the mid-1990s, Rea worked with Land, formed by Jeff Greinke, a musician Rea met in Seattle in the early 1980s. The band has included trumpeter Lesli Dalaba, bassist Fred Chalenor, drummers Bill Rieflin and Greg Gilmore, and Chapman stick player George Soler. Between 1998 and 2001 Rea led the free-jazz quartet Stackpole, which won a Golden Ear award from Earshot Jazz magazine for Best Northwest Outside Jazz Group in 2000. For ten years he contributed to bands led by singer-songwriter Eric Apoe.

For MoonJune he has recorded albums with Moraine, the free-jazz band Iron Kim Style, and Jon Davis's band Zhongyu. Moonjune released his solo album Views from Chicheng Precipice, an unorthodox take on the traditional music of East Asia. He has worked with Ffej and Frank Junk in the trio Tempered Steel, with Hawkwind founder Nik Turner and drummer Jack Gold-Molina in Flame Tree, and in his Tanabata Ensemble. Rea has toured in Russia (chronicled in his book Tuva and Busted [Blue Ear Books, 2021]) and Taiwan and has performed in England, Germany, and Mexico. With several partners, he founded the Seaprog festival for progressive rock and avant rock and the Zero-G Concert Series. Both take place in Seattle.

Awards and honors
Rea has been awarded grants for his musical activities by the U.S. Department of State (Fulbright-Hays program), Arts International Fund for U.S. Artists Abroad, Seattle Arts Commission, King County Arts Commission, Malcolm S. Morse Foundation, Jack Straw Foundation, and the Washington State China Relations Council.

Discography

As leader or co-leader
 1990: Shadow in Dreams
 2004: Free Touching: Live in Beijing at Keep in Touch with Han Bennink, Wang Yong, Andreas Schreiber, Steffen Schorn, Claudio Puntin, Lesli Dalaba
 2010: Views from Chicheng Precipice (Moonjune)
 2012: Subduction Zone with Wally Shoup
 2016: Black River Transect: Dennis Rea Tanabata Ensemble in Concert
 2021: Giant Steppes (Moonjune)

As sideman
With Alex's Hand
 2014: Alex's Hand Presents: The Roaches

With Eric Apoe
 1996: Songs of Love and Doom
 2000: Dream Asylum
 2002: Radioation
 2005: Book of Puzzles
 2008: The Man in the Sun

With Roland Barker and Bill Rieflin
 2014: Shredder Orpheus

With Marc Barreca
 1983, 2016: Music Works for Industry

With Chekov
 2008: Born to be Quiet

With the Jim Cutler Jazz Orchestra
 2014: Gimme Some Sugar, Baby!

With Earthstar
 1978: Salterbarty Tales
 1979: French Skyline
 1981: Atomkraft? Nein, Danke!

With Flame Tree
 2016: Flame Tree

With Craig Flory and Doug Haire
 1998: Wigwam Bendix

With Jeff Greinke
 1994: Big Weather
 1998: Swimming
 2013: Scenes from a Train

With Doug Haire
 1992: Locale

With Iron Kim Style
 2010: Iron Kim Style

With Land
 1995: Land
 1997: Archipelago
 2001: Road Movies

With Moraine
 2009: Manifest Density
 2011: Metamorphic Rock
 2014: Groundswell

With Savant
 1983: The Neo-Realist (At Risk)
 2016: Artificial Dance

With Stackpole
 2001: Stackpole

With Tempered Steel
 2012: Tempered Steel

With Ting Bu Dong
 2008: Ting Bu Dong

With Rik Wright
 2000: Bleeding Laughter

With Hector Zazou
 2003: Strong Currents

With Zhongyu
 2016: Zhongyu

References

Living people
1957 births
American rock guitarists
American male guitarists
20th-century American guitarists
20th-century American male musicians